Đinh La Thăng (10 September 1960) was a former Minister of Transport, former Communist Party Secretary of Ho Chi Minh City, and former member of the Politburo. On 22 January 2018 he became the first top Party official in several decades to be tried and sentenced to prison for corruption.

Early life and political career
Đinh La Thăng was born in 1960 in Yên Bình Commune, Ý Yên District, Nam Định Province, and graduated from the University of Hanoi's School of Finance and Accounting (now the Academy of Finance). He was a member of the 10th and 11th Central Committees of the Communist Party of Vietnam, a member of the 12th Politburo of the Communist Party of Vietnam, and also a member of the National Assembly of Vietnam from the XIth through XIIIth sessions. Before becoming the Minister of Transport, he was the chairman of the Board of PetroVietnam, the national oil and gas company; Deputy Secretary of the Communist Party of Thừa Thiên–Huế Province (November 2003-December 2005); and Chairman of Song Da Corporation (April 2001-October 2003).

When controversy erupted in May–June 2016 over the Americans' appointment of Bob Kerrey as chairman of the Board of Trustees of Fulbright University Vietnam (on 25 February 1969 Kerrey had commanded the U.S. Navy SEALS unit that carried out the Thạnh Phong massacre), Đinh La Thăng was the only high-ranking Vietnamese official who publicly supported the selection of Kerrey.

Đinh La Thăng was expelled from his position in the Politburo on 7 May 2017 due to his violations of the law while chairman of the Board of PetroVietnam, violations that led to embarrassing economic losses.

He was arrested on 8 December 2017 for investigation of his mismanagement of PetroVietnam, resulting in a loss of 800 billion VND (US$35.28 million) from its investment in Oceanbank.  On 22 January 2018 he was sentenced to 13 years in prison.

He was tried again on 14 and 15 December 2020 for his involvement in another corruption scandal. He received 10 years in prison.

He has a daughter, Đinh Hương Ly (born 1984), who worked for Morgan Stanley from 2006 to 2013.

References

External links

Leaders of the Ministry of Transport have a meeting to congratulate new Minister Dinh La Thang
Profile of Dinh La Thang on the official website of the government of Vietnam

1960 births
Living people
Government ministers of Vietnam
People from Nam Định province
Members of the 12th Politburo of the Communist Party of Vietnam